Altanzulyn Altansükh (born 12 December 1991) is a Mongolian former professional cyclist, who rode professionally between 2013 and 2018.

Major results
Source: 

2009
 National Junior Road Championships
1st  Time trial
3rd Road race
 National Road Championships
5th Time trial
8th Road race
2010
 6th Road race, National Road Championships
2011
 National Road Championships
1st  Road race
2nd Time trial
2012
 1st Overall Tour of Poyang Lake
1st Stage 2
2013
 3rd  Road race, East Asian Games
 9th Tour of Nanjing
2014
 3rd Time trial, National Road Championships
2015
 National Road Championships
1st  Road race
2nd Time trial
2016
 6th Time trial, National Road Championships
2017
 National Road Championships
1st  Road race
8th Time trial
2018
 4th Team time trial, Asian Road Championships
 5th Road race, National Road Championships

References

External links

1991 births
Living people
Mongolian male cyclists
Cyclists at the 2014 Asian Games
Asian Games competitors for Mongolia
21st-century Mongolian people